Gordon Van Tol (February 22, 1960 – January 11, 2010) was a Canadian water polo player.

Van Tol played for the Canadian national water polo team in the 1984 Olympic Games, scoring one goal. He also played in the 1983 Pan American Games.

He died at the age of 49 from a heart attack on January 11, 2010.

References

External links
Gordon Van Tol's profile at Sports Reference.com

1960 births
2010 deaths
Canadian male water polo players
Olympic water polo players of Canada
Water polo players at the 1984 Summer Olympics